Cook v Deeks [1916] UKPC 10 is a Canadian company law case, relevant also for UK company law, concerning the illegitimate diversion of a corporate opportunity. It was decided by the Judicial Committee of the Privy Council, at that time the court of last resort within the British Empire, on appeal from the Appellate Division of the Supreme Court of Ontario, Canada.

Because decisions of the Judicial Committee have persuasive value in the United Kingdom, even when decided under the law of another member of the Commonwealth,  this decision has been followed in the United Kingdom courts.  In UK company law, the case would now be seen as falling within the Companies Act 2006 section 175, with a failure to have ratification of breach by independent shareholders under section 239.

Facts
The Toronto Construction Co. had four directors, Mr GM Deeks, Mr GS Deeks, Mr Hinds, and Mr Cook. It helped in construction of railways in Canada. The first three directors wanted to exclude Mr Cook from the business. Each held a quarter of the company's shares. GM Deeks, GS Deeks, and Hinds took a contract with the Canadian Pacific Railway Company (for building a line at the Guelph Junction and Hamilton branch) in their own names. They then passed a shareholder resolution declaring that the company had no interest in the contract. Mr Cook claimed that the contract did belong to the Toronto Construction Co and the shareholder resolution ratifying their actions should not be valid because the three directors used their votes to carry it.

Decision
The Privy Council advised that the three directors had breached their duty of loyalty to the company, that the shareholder ratification was a fraud on Mr Cook as a minority shareholder, and invalid. Giving the advice, The Lord Chancellor, Lord Buckmaster held the result was that the profits made on the contractual opportunity were to be held on trust for the Toronto Construction Co.

Lord Buckmaster said that the three had,

See also

UK company law

Notes

References
North-West Transportation Co v Beatty (1887) 12 App Cas 589
Burland v Earle [1902] AC 83

Judicial Committee of the Privy Council cases on appeal from Canada
United Kingdom company case law
1916 in Canadian case law